The Ringing Bell (2007) is the fourth solo album release from singer-songwriter Derek Webb.

Background
Webb has described the record as a rock record but that "it's fitting that it would be a hard thing to categorize that you couldn't just call it a rock record, that it would be too easy." He also stated that the song "Name" was "probably as close to a thesis as the record has." It carries Webb's theme that "categories in general are not helpful...it's hard to live in a world of categories when really what we need is to know each other and to engage each other and not to let our categories do the talking."

Webb has stated in response to some of his lyrics in "A Love That's Stronger Than Our Fear" and "A Savior on Capitol Hill", which generated talk that Webb was against the George Bush administration, that "I'm not anti-Bush at all...all things considered he deserves the benefit of the doubt and I want to give it to him...This has nothing to do with any specific people."

Reception

The Ringing Bell received universally positive reviews from Christian critics. The review site Patrol gave the album a nine on the site's ten-point scale – a record high – praising its "substance." Paste Magazine gave The Ringing Bell a 5 out of 5 and ranked it No. 27 on their Top 100 albums of 2007.

Track listing

Personnel

Band
Derek Webb – vocals, acoustic and electric guitars, Rhodes piano (1), upright and tack piano (1, 2), hand claps (4), noise (1)
Cason Cooley – organ (2, 6), percussion (3, 4, 6), upright and tack piano (4, 5, 7), hand claps (4), make out guitar (4), guitar solo (6)
Matt Pierson – bass guitar
Will Sayles – drums, percussion

Additional musicians
Ben Shive – string arrangements (2, 5, 8), Mellotron (2, 8)
Jason Fitz – violin (2, 5, 8)
Court Clement – electric guitar (4)
Gary Burnette – electric guitar (5, 7)
Steve Mason – lap steel, electric and slide guitar (8), Leslie guitar (9)

Technical
 Derek Webb – producer, additional engineer, vocal engineer at Sumner Studio, East Nashville, Tennessee, art direction
 Cason Cooley – producer, additional engineer at The Smoakstack, Nashville, Tennessee
 Andy Hunt – engineer at The Smoakstack, Nashville, Tennessee
 Shane D. Wilson – mixing at Pentavarit, Nashville, Tennessee
 Jim DeMain – mastering at Yes Master, Nashville, Tennessee
 Brannon Mcallister – art direction
 Jeremy Cowart – photography
 Chris Koelle – illustration
 Brannon McAllister – design, layout

Charts

References

2007 albums
Derek Webb albums